Marie-Galante is an island in the Leeward Islands. From 1648 to 1749 Marie-Galante was administered by a French governor or royal lieutenant, who often reported to the governor of nearby Guadeloupe, or by the governor of Guadeloupe directly.

Origins

The island was discovered by Christopher Columbus on 3 November 1493, and claimed for Spain with the name Santa Maria la Galante. 
On 8 November 1648 France incorporated the island into the Guadeloupe administration.
Jacques de Boisseret leased the island from the king of France from 4 September 1649 to 1643.
His widow abandoned her claim in 1660.

Administrators

The administrators of Marie-Galante were:

The island was occupied by the British in 1794, and after this no longer had an independent administrator

See also  
 List of colonial and departmental heads of Guadeloupe
 List of governors general of the French Antilles

Notes

Sources

Lists of French colonial governors and administrators